The 1988–89 Loyola Marymount Lions men's basketball team represented Loyola Marymount University during the 1988–89 NCAA Division I men's basketball season. The Lions were led by fourth-year head coach Paul Westhead. They played their home games at Gersten Pavilion in Los Angeles, California as members of the West Coast Conference.

LMU led the nation in scoring (112.5 points per game) for the second consecutive year. Junior All-American Hank Gathers became the second player in NCAA Division I history to lead the nation in scoring (32.7) and rebounding (13.7) in the same season.

Roster

Schedule and results

|-
!colspan=12 style=| Non-conference regular season

|-
!colspan=12 style=| WCC regular season

|-
!colspan=12 style=| WCC Tournament

|-
!colspan=12 style=| NCAA Tournament

Sources

Rankings

Awards
 All-Americans
 Hank Gathers – 3rd Team (AP, UPI), 2nd Team (USBWA)

 NCAA Scoring Leader
 Hank Gathers – 32.7 PPG

 NCAA Rebounding Leader
 Hank Gathers – 13.7 PPG

 WCC Player of the Year
 Hank Gathers

 WCC tournament MVP
 Hank Gathers

Records
Season
Team
 Points, Both Teams – 331 vs. U.S. International (January 31, 1989)
 Field Goals, Both Teams – 130 vs. U.S. International (January 31, 1989)
 Field Goal Attempts, Both Teams – 245 vs. U.S. International (January 31, 1989)
 Points in a Half, Both Teams – 172 vs. Gonzaga (February 18, 1989)

References

Loyola Marymount Lions men's basketball seasons
Loyola Marymount
Loyola Marymount
Loyola Marymount
Loyola Marymount
Loyola Marymount
Loyola Marymount